The 1991 African U-16 Qualifying for World Cup was a qualifying edition organized by the Confederation of African Football (CAF) into the age-limit raised FIFA U-17 World Championship. The three winners qualified to the 1991 FIFA U-17 World Championship.

First round
The winner advanced to the Second Round.

|}

Togo advanced after the withraw of Benin.

Second round
The winners advanced to the Third Round.

|}

Congo advanced after 5−1 on aggregate.

Mauritania advanced after 1−0 on aggregate.

Egypt advanced on away goal after 1−1 on aggregate.

Zambia advanced after 4−0 on aggregate.

Sudan advanced after 2−0 on aggregate.

Guinea advanced after 1−0 on aggregate.

Ghana advanced on away goal after 3−3 on aggregate.

Senegal advanced after 1−0 on aggregate.

Ivory Coast advanced after the withraw of Liberia.

Cameroon advanced after the withraw of Central African Republic.

Gabon advanced after the withraw of Zaire.

Morocco advanced after the withraw of Gambia.

Third round
The winners advanced to the Fourth Round.

|}

Gabon advanced after 1−0 on aggregate.

Sudan advanced after 3−1 on aggregate.

Ghana advanced after 3−0 on aggregate.

Congo advanced after the withraw of Ivory Coast.

Egypt advanced after the withraw of Mauritania.

Morocco advanced after the withraw of Senegal.

Fourth round
The winners qualified for the 1991 FIFA U-17 World Championship.

|}

 The second legs were scratched and Sudan and Ghana qualified for the 1991 U-17 FIFA World Cup as Egypt and Morocco were ejected from the competition for using overaged players.

Congo qualified after 5−1 on aggregate.

Sudan qualified after disqualification of Egypt.

Ghana qualified after disqualification of Morocco.

Countries to participate in 1991 FIFA U-17 World Championship
The 3 teams which qualified for 1991 FIFA U-17 World Championship.

References

External links
Details qualifying - rsssf.com

1991 in African football
African U-17 Qualifying for World Cup